Rafał Choynowski (born 23 June 1960) is a Polish equestrian. He competed in the team eventing at the 1996 Summer Olympics.

References

1960 births
Living people
Polish male equestrians
Olympic equestrians of Poland
Equestrians at the 1996 Summer Olympics
Sportspeople from Poznań
20th-century Polish people